Roger Kent Withrow (born August 28, 1957) is a former Paralympics shooter from the United States.

He is the only Paralympic shooter from America to win gold at the 1984 Summer Paralympics.

References

Paralympic shooters of the United States
Shooters at the 1984 Summer Paralympics
Paralympic gold medalists for the United States
Living people
1957 births
Medalists at the 1984 Summer Paralympics
Paralympic medalists in shooting